The Rooterberg (840 m) is a mountain north of the Alps, located between Root and Udligenswil in the canton of Lucerne. The mountain lies north of Lake Lucerne and west of Lake Zug, at the foothills of the Alps.

References

External links
 Rooterberg on Hikr

Mountains of the Alps
Mountains of the canton of Lucerne
Mountains of Switzerland
Mountains of Switzerland under 1000 metres